Straumsetervatnet or Selavatnet is a lake on the border of the municipalities of Åfjord and Steinkjer in Trøndelag county, Norway. The majority of the  lake lies in Steinkjer, with the northwestern end of the lake partially lying in Åfjord. The village of Sela (and Sela Church) lies on the northern side of the lake and the village of Sandsetra at the southeastern end of the lake. The lake is one of the sources for the Folla river system which flows into the Trondheimsfjord at the village of Follafoss.

See also
List of lakes in Norway

References

Åfjord
Steinkjer
Lakes of Trøndelag